Short Back 'n' Sides is the fifth studio album by Ian Hunter. Unsure of which direction he should take, Ian Hunter finally decided to collaborate with Mick Jones, who gave Hunter's songs a tougher and heavier touch. Fellow Clash member Topper Headon as well as Mick Ronson, Todd Rundgren and Ellen Foley also appeared on this album.

In 1995, Chrysalis released a 2 CD set with a remastered version of the album and bonus CD with outtakes of the Chrysalis period. The track "Noises" is an experimental track with many samples used as part of the song and "Theatre of the Absurd" is Ian's only reggae song, inspired by the Ladbroke Grove area of London.

Track listing
All songs written by Ian Hunter; except where indicated
"Central Park n' West" – 4:00
"Lisa Likes Rock n' Roll" – 3:56
"I Need Your Love" – 3:34
"Old Records Never Die" – 4:18
"Noises" (Ian Hunter, Tommy Morrongiello) – 5:51
"Rain" – 5:54
"Gun Control" – 3:12
"Theatre of the Absurd" – 5:49
"Leave Me Alone" – 3:29
"Keep on Burning" – 4:46

1995 Bonus CD (Long Odds and Out-takes)
"Detroit" (rough mix – instrumental) – 3:42
"Na Na Na" – 4:13
"I Need Your Love" (rough mix) – 3:46
"Rain" (alternative mix) – 5:50
"I Believe in You" – 4:15
"Listen to the Eight Track" – 6:08
"You Stepped Into My Dreams" – 4:41
"Venus in the Bathtub" – 4:29
"Theatre of the Absurd" – 6:08
"Detroit" (out take 5 – vocal) – 4:00
"Na Na Na" (extended mix) – 4:29
"China" (Mick Ronson vocal) – 4:36
"Old Records Never Die" (version 1) – 4:18

Personnel
Ian Hunter - lead vocals, guitars, piano
Mick Ronson - lead guitar, keyboards, vocals
Tommy Mandel - keyboards
Tommy Morrongiello - bass, vocals
Martin Briley - bass
Eric Parker - drums
George Meyer - keyboards, vocals
Mick Jones - guitars, vocals
Topper Headon - drums, percussion
Tymon Dogg - violin
Ellen Foley - vocals
Miller Anderson - vocals
Mick Baraken - guitar on "Gun Control"
Wells Kelly - drums on "Gun Control"
John Holbrook - bass on "Gun Control"
Gary Windo - alto saxophone on "I Need Your Love"
Roger Powell - backing vocals on "I Need Your Love"
Todd Rundgren - bass, backing vocals on "I Need Your Love"
Technical
Mixed by Bob Clearmountain; David Tickle on "Rain"
Lynn Goldsmith - photography

References

1981 albums
Ian Hunter (singer) albums
Albums produced by Mick Ronson
Chrysalis Records albums